Copadichromis ilesi is a species of haplochromine cichlid, which is endemic to Lake Malawi, where it is widespread, although not recorded from Mozambique. The specific name of this species honours the British fisheries scientist and ichthyologis Thomas Derrick Iles (1927-2017).

References

ilesi
Taxa named by Ad Konings
Fish described in 1999
Taxonomy articles created by Polbot